Robert Wilkinson  was an Australian cricketer. He played one first-class cricket match for Victoria in 1854.

See also
 List of Victoria first-class cricketers

References

Year of birth missing
Year of death missing
Australian cricketers
Victoria cricketers
Place of birth missing
Melbourne Cricket Club cricketers